The 2023 FAI Cup is the 103rd edition of the Republic of Ireland's primary national cup competition. This edition features teams from the League of Ireland Premier Division and the First Division, as well as non-league teams. The competition begins with qualifying on the week ending 9 April 2023.

The winners of the FAI Cup earns automatic qualification for the 2024–25 UEFA Europa Conference League.

Teams 
The 2023 FAI Cup is a knockout competition with 40 teams taking part. The competitors consist of the 20 teams from the League of Ireland and 20 teams from the regional leagues of the Republic of Ireland football league system).

Preliminary round

The eight preliminary round ties begin over the weekend of the 9th of April with the first round proper due to be played in July. The four non-league teams receive byes into the first round are; Lucan United, Gorey Rangers, Avondale United and Bangor Celtic.

References

FAI Cup seasons
FAI Cup
2023 in Republic of Ireland association football cups